The following is a list of Swedish composers:

Gustaf Düben (the Elder) (1624–1690), composer, organist of the German Church in Stockholm, Director of the Royal Swedish Orchestra
Johan Helmich Roman (1694–1758), known as the "Swedish Handel"
Johan Agrell (1701–1765) full name: Johan Joachim Agrell
Carl Michael Bellman (1740–1795)
Johann Gottlieb Naumann (1741–1801), born in Germany; composed in Sweden
Johan Wikmanson (1753–1800)
Joseph Martin Kraus (1756–1792), born in Germany
Johann Christian Friedrich Hæffner (1759–1833), born in Germany
Joachim Nicolas Eggert (1779–1813)
Johan Fredrik Berwald (1787–1861), violinist, concertmaster of the Swedish Royal Orchestra
Hedda Wrangel (1792–1833)
Caroline Ridderstolpe (1793–1878)
Franz Adolf Berwald (1796–1868), composer, musician and businessman; and the best-known of the musical Berwalds
Adolf Fredrik Lindblad (1801–1878)
Jacob Niclas Ahlström (1805–1857), kapellmeister and composer
Otto Lindblad (1809–1864)
Gunnar Wennerberg (1817–1901), uncle of Sara Wennerberg-Reuter
Emilie Hammarskjöld (1821–1854), member of the Royal Swedish Academy of Music
Fritz Arlberg (1830-1896), composer and singer and member of the Royal Swedish Academy of Music
Ludvig Norman (1831–1885), considered by some the outstanding Swedish composer between Franz Berwald and Wilhelm Stenhammar
August Söderman (1832–1876), full name: Johan August Söderman
Oscar de Wahl (1832–1873), composer of various cuplés and plays
Gustav Stolpe (1833–1901)
Bertha Tammelin (1836–1915)
Lotten Edholm (1839–1930)
Elfrida Andrée (1841–1929)
Andreas Hallén (1846–1925), full name: Johan Andreas Hallén
Jacob Adolf Hägg (1850–1928)
Helena Munktell (1852–1919)
Amanda Maier (1853–1894), full name: Amanda Röntgen-Maier
Emil Sjögren (1853–1918), late romantic miniaturist
Wilhelm Harteveld (1859–1927)
Valborg Aulin (1860–1928), full name: Laura Valborg Aulin. Sister of Tor Auoin.
Tor Aulin (1866–1914), brother of Valborg Aulin
Wilhelm Peterson-Berger (1867–1942), full name: Olof Wilhelm Peterson-Berger
Henning Mankell (1868–1930)
Wilhelm Stenhammar (1871–1927)
Ruben Liljefors (1871–1936), full name: Ruben Mattias Liljefors
Hugo Alfvén (1872–1960), full name: Hugo Emil Alfvén
Sara Wennerberg-Reuter (1875–1959)
Adolf Wiklund (1879–1950)
Otto Olsson (1879–1964)
Viktor Widqvist (1881–1952)
Edvin Kallstenius (1881–1967)
Ture Rangström (1884–1947)
Sam Rydberg (1885–1956)
Kurt Atterberg (1887–1974), full name: Kurt Magnus Atterberg
Gösta Nystroem (1890–1966)
Evert Taube (1890–1976), full name: Evert Axel Taube
Hilding Rosenberg (1892–1985)
John Fernström (1897–1961), born in China of Swedish parents
Yngve Sköld (1899–1992), full name: Karl Yngve Sköld
Dag Wirén (1905–1986)
Lars-Erik Larsson (1908–1986)
Gunnar de Frumerie (1908–1987)
Erland von Koch (1910–2009)
Allan Pettersson (1911–1980), full name: Gustaf Allan Pettersson
Ebbe Grims-land (1915–2015)
Karl-Birger Blomdahl (1916–1968)
Sven-Erik Bäck (1919–1994)
Ingvar Lidholm (1921–2017)
Lars Edlund (1922–2013)
Bengt Hambraeus (1928–2000)
Bo Linde (1933–1970)
Ulf Björlin (1933–1993), full name: Mats Ulf Stefan Björlin. Composer and conductor
Lars Gunnar Bodin (born 1935)
Ralph Lundsten (born 1936)
Bo Nilsson (born 1937)
Sven-David Sandström (1942-2019)
Daniel Börtz (born 1943)
Benny Andersson (born 1946)
Nils-Göran Areskoug (born 1951), original name: Sundin. Physician, musicologist, composer, author and interdisciplinary scholar
Hans Gefors (born 1952)
Anders Nilsson (born 1954)
Jan Sandström (born 1954)
Rolf Martinsson (born 1956)
Michael Saxell (born 1956)
Sten Melin (born 1957)
Karin Rehnqvist (born 1957)
Fredrik Sixten (born 1962), composer of mainly church and chamber music
Robert Wells (born 1962)
Yngwie Malmsteen (born 1963)
Fredrik Högberg (born 1971)
Benjamin Staern (born 1978)
Ludwig Göransson (born 1984)
Jonatan Sersam (born 1986)

Swedish